Aloysius Isaac Mandlenkhosi Zwane (born 6 May 1932 in Msunduze) was an Liswati clergyman and bishop for the Roman Catholic Diocese of Manzini. He was ordained in 1964. He was appointed in 1976. He died in 1980.

References 

Swazi Roman Catholic bishops
1932 births
1980 deaths